Air Canada Tower (also known as Altoria, and previously known until Winter 2020 as Aimia Tower),   is a 35-storey mixed-use skyscraper in Montreal, Quebec, Canada. The first ten floors are home to office spaces, while the remaining 25 floors consist of 152 condos. The office component is anchored by Aimia and is known as the Aimia Tower.

The tower is located right next to Complexe Maisonneuve, the Tour de la Bourse and Square-Victoria-OACI Metro Station.

The project's promoter is Kevric Corporation. Construction work started in 2011 and was completed in 2014.

References

External links

Aimia Tower (Official website)

Skyscrapers in Montreal
Residential condominiums in Canada
Residential skyscrapers in Canada
Skyscraper office buildings in Canada
Downtown Montreal